David Pope (April 15, 1962 – October 21, 2016) was an American basketball player who played in the National Basketball Association (NBA). Born in Newport News, Virginia, he attended Norfolk State University.

A ,  small forward, Pope was selected in the third round (62nd overall) of the 1984 NBA draft by the Utah Jazz. His short playing career lasted from 1984–86 with the Kansas City Kings and the Seattle SuperSonics. He died at the age of 54 on October 21, 2016.

References

External links
NBA stats @ basketballreference.com

1962 births
2016 deaths
Albuquerque Silvers players
American men's basketball players
Basketball players from Virginia
Kansas City Kings players
Norfolk State Spartans men's basketball players
Sportspeople from Newport News, Virginia
Seattle SuperSonics players
Small forwards
Utah Jazz draft picks
Wyoming Wildcatters players
American expatriate basketball people in the Philippines
Tanduay Rhum Masters players
Philippine Basketball Association imports